Polyommatus dama is a species of butterfly in the family Lycaenidae. It is endemic to Turkey. Its natural habitat is temperate shrubland. It is threatened by habitat loss.

References

Sources

Butterflies of Asia
Butterflies of Europe
Polyommatus
Endemic fauna of Turkey
Butterflies described in 1892
Taxonomy articles created by Polbot